The Zanata Stone (Spanish: Piedra Zanata), also known as the Zenata Stone, is a small stele with engravings. The tablet is presumably of Guanche origin. It was found in 1992 near a mountain known as Montaña de las Flores (Mountain of the Flowers) in the municipality of El Tanque, located in the northwestern part of Tenerife, Canary Islands.

The Zanata Stone depicts a kind of fish. According to Rafael Gonzalez Antón, the director of the Archaeological Museum of Tenerife, its characters appear to be in Tifinagh. The latter alphabet is descended from the ancient Libyco-Berber script, and is used today by the Tuareg.

The Zanata Stone seems to have been related to the magical-religious traditional faith of the Guanches.

Some Guanches of Tenerife were also known as Zanata or Zenete, or "those with a cut tongue". The Zanata Stone is currently in the Archaeological Museum of Tenerife (Santa Cruz de Tenerife).

See also 

Cave of Achbinico
Church of the Guanche People
Guanche mummies
Royal Mausoleum of Mauretania
Stone of the Guanches

References 

Guanche
Archaeology of Tenerife
Metaphors referring to objects
Multilingual texts
Stones
Archaeological artifacts
Archaeological discoveries in Spain
Steles